Ralph G. Foster (25 May 1935 - 3 May 2021) is a British athlete and Paralympic Games gold medal winner. After an accident in his late twenties left him a paraplegic he eventually became involved in disabled sports. He was a swimmer, snooker player and lawn bowler. He represented Great Britain in lawn bowling at the 1988 Summer Paralympics in Seoul and won a gold medal. Ralph died on 3 May 2021 after a long illness.

See also
Lawn bowls at the 1988 Summer Paralympics

References 

1934 births
Living people
Paralympic gold medalists for Great Britain
Paralympic lawn bowls players of Great Britain
Sportspeople from Nottingham
Lawn bowls players at the 1988 Summer Paralympics
Medalists at the 1988 Summer Paralympics
Paralympic medalists in lawn bowls